Longueil may refer to:

 Communes in France
 Longueil, Seine-Maritime, in the Seine-Maritime department
 Longueil-Annel, in the Oise department
 Longueil-Sainte-Marie, in the Oise department

 People
 Christophe de Longueil, Belgian humanist
 René de Longueil, French minister in charge of finances under Louis XIII

Quebec (Canada)
 A commonly made mistake when spelling the city of Longueuil

See also 
 Longueuil (disambiguation)